George Ryan Fowler (born 20 December 1997) is an English professional footballer who plays as a centre-back for National League South club Maidstone United.

Club career
Born in Chelmsford, Fowler attended Debenham High School in Suffolk. He captained the school team, playing as a central midfielder in the same side as his twin brother.

Fowler first joined Ipswich Town during the 2011–12 campaign as a schoolboy and signed his first scholarship in July 2014. He played for the under-18 team while he was still an under-15, and earned a one-year professional contract in the summer of 2016. The following year, his contract was extended by a further 12 months.

He went on to make his full senior debut in a 2–1 defeat against Crystal Palace in the EFL Cup second round on 22 August 2017.

On 30 August 2017, along with teammate Adam McDonnell, Fowler joined National League side Aldershot Town on a one-month loan. Three days later, he made his debut during their 1–0 home victory over Solihull Moors, featuring for the entire 90 minutes. Following several extensions to his loan, Fowler agreed to join Aldershot permanently on 31 January 2018.

On 26 October 2021, Fowler joined National League South side, Maidstone United on an initial one-month loan. Following five first-team appearances, Fowler's loan was made permanent a month later for an undisclosed fee, ending his three-year affiliation with the Hampshire-based side.

Career statistics

References

External links

1998 births
Living people
Sportspeople from Chelmsford
English footballers
Association football central defenders
Ipswich Town F.C. players
Aldershot Town F.C. players
Maidstone United F.C. players
English Football League players
National League (English football) players